Cobb Creek is a stream in the U.S. states of Minnesota and South Dakota. It is a tributary of the Lac qui Parle River.

Cobb Creek has the name of M. G. Cobb, a Deuel County civil servant.

See also
List of rivers of Minnesota
List of rivers of South Dakota

References

Rivers of Yellow Medicine County, Minnesota
Rivers of Deuel County, South Dakota
Rivers of Minnesota
Rivers of South Dakota